"Wa'ney Island Cockfight" or "The Bonny Grey" is an English folk song, Roud 211. Variants of the song exist across northern England from Cumbria to Shropshire.

Lyrics 
As with many folk songs, the lyrics vary depending on the source, with references to well-known local figures and locations in various regional versions. However, the central theme of a cockfight in which the "Bonny Grey" is an unexpected winner remains.

Presented below are a small sample of the lyrics sung by Martin Wyndham-Reed on English Sporting Ballads, Broadside BRO128 in which the cockfight takes place on Walney Island.

Come all ye cockers far and near

I'll tell of a cock-fight, when and where:

At Tummerel Hill I've heard them say,

The Northscale lads had a bonny grey.

Two dozen lads from Biggar came

To Tummerel Hill to see the game.

They brought along with them that day

A black to match with the bonny grey.

A sample of another set of lyrics from the Ballads & Songs of Lancashire, which places the cockfight in Liverpool, is presented below for comparison.

Come all you cock-merchants far and near,

Did you hear of a cock-fight happening here?

Those Liverpool lads, I've heard them say,

'Tween the Charcoal Black and the Bonny Gray.

Recordings

References

English folk songs
Cockfighting